The Church of the Advent built in 1872  is a historic Carpenter Gothic Episcopal church located at 412 Oak Street, in Farmington, Minnesota, in the United States. On December 31, 1979, it was added to the National Register of Historic Places.

The Church of the Advent is still a functioning parish serving Dakota County, Minnesota and surrounding areas. The 1872 church building, which seats only 70 people is used as a wedding chapel, while larger worship services are held in the Michael and Lisbeth Sly Room built in 1976. The rector is the Rev. Elaine Barber.

See also

List of Registered Historic Places in Minnesota

References

External links

Church of the Advent website
Church of the Advent history
Archiplanet article
 Dakota County Historical Society listing

Churches on the National Register of Historic Places in Minnesota
Episcopal church buildings in Minnesota
Carpenter Gothic church buildings in Minnesota
Churches in Dakota County, Minnesota
National Register of Historic Places in Dakota County, Minnesota